The Bold and the Beautiful is an American television soap opera that has aired on CBS since March 23, 1987. The following is a list of awards and nominations the show's crew and cast have received.

Daytime Emmy Awards

Outstanding Drama Series

Outstanding Drama Series Directing Team

Outstanding Drama Series Writing Team

Outstanding Lead Actor in a Drama Series

Outstanding Lead Actress in a Drama Series

Outstanding Supporting Actor in a Drama Series

Outstanding Supporting Actress in a Drama Series

Outstanding Younger Actor in a Drama Series

Outstanding Younger Actress in a Drama Series

Other Awards

ALMA Awards

British Soap Awards

Directors Guild of America

NAACP Image Awards

Outstanding Actor in a Daytime Drama Series

Imagen Foundation Awards

Prism Awards

Rose d'Or Year

Young Artist Awards
The Young Artist Awards are presented annually by the Young Artist Association. Originally known as the Youth In Film Awards for the first twenty years. The soap opera has earned 13 nominations and 4 wins.

References

Lists of awards by television series
The Bold and the Beautiful